Jatropha chamelensis is a species of plant in the family Euphorbiaceae. It is endemic to Mexico, but restricted to a small region on the Pacific coast, including the Reserva de la Biosfera Chamela-Cuixmala in Jalisco and the tropical deciduous forest of Nayarit.

References

YM Buckley, CK Kelly - Plant Ecology, 2003
ER Garcia - 2009 - unibio.unam.mx
LA Perez Jimenez - Bol. Soc. Bot. Mex., 1982

chamelensis
Endemic flora of Mexico
Flora of Nayarit
Flora of Jalisco
Vulnerable plants
Taxonomy articles created by Polbot